Hubbard Independent School District is a public school district based in Hubbard, Texas (USA).

Located in Hill County, small portions of the district extend into Limestone and Navarro counties.

In 2009, the school district was rated "academically acceptable" by the Texas Education Agency.

Schools
Hubbard High School (Grades 9-12)
Hubbard Middle School (Grades 6-8)
Hubbard Elementary School (Grades PK-5)

References

External links
Hubbard ISD

School districts in Hill County, Texas
School districts in Limestone County, Texas
School districts in Navarro County, Texas